Vitaioli is a surname. Notable people with the surname include:

Fabio Vitaioli (born 1984), Sanmarinese footballer
Matteo Vitaioli (born 1989), Sanmarinese footballer